Gemixystus is a genus of sea snails, marine gastropod mollusks in the subfamily Trophoninae of the family Muricidae, the murex snails or rock snails.

Species
Species within the genus Gemixystus include:
 Gemixystus calcareus Houart & Héros, 2012
 Gemixystus fimbriatus Houart, 2004
 † Gemixystus hypsellus (Tate, 1888) 
 † Gemixystus icosiphyllus (Tate, 1888)
 Gemixystus impolitus Houart & Héros, 2019
 Gemixystus laminatus (Petterd, 1884)
 Gemixystus lenis Houart & Héros, 2019
 Gemixystus leptos (Houart, 1995)
 Gemixystus polyphillius (Tenison-Woods, 1879)
 Gemixystus recurvatus (Verco, 1909)
 Gemixystus rhodanos Houart, 2004
 Gemixystus rippingalei (Houart, 1998)
 Gemixystus stimuleus (Hedley, 1907)
 Gemixystus transkeiensis (Houart, 1987)
 † Gemixystus zebra Houart, 2004
Species brought into synonymy
 Gemixystus apipagodus (Ponder, 1972) † : synonym of Xymenella apipagoda (Ponder, 1972) †
 Gemixystus comes (Maxwell, 1992) † : synonym of Xymenella comes (P. A. Maxwell, 1992) †
 Gemixystus protocarinatus (Laws, 1941) † : synonym of Xymenella protocarinata Laws, 1941 †

References

 Houart R. & Héros V. (2019). The genus Gemixystus Iredale, 1929 (Gastropoda: Muricidae: Trophoninae) in New Caledonia with the description of two new species and some notes on the genus in the Indo-West Pacific. Novapex. 20(1-2): 1-12.

External links
 redale, T. (1929). Mollusca from the continental shelf of eastern Australia. Records of the Australian Museum. 17(4): 157-189
 Houart R. (2004). A review of Gemixystus Iredale, 1929 (Gastropoda: Muricidae) from Australia and New Zealand. Novapex. 5 (Hors-série 2): 1-27

 
Trophoninae